The Landlord and Tenant Board is an adjudicative tribunal operating in the province of Ontario that provides dispute resolution of landlord and tenant matters under the Residential Tenancies Act, 2006. It is one of the 13 adjudicative tribunals overseen by the Ministry of the Attorney General that make up Tribunals Ontario.

History
Historically, landlord and tenant relations in Ontario were governed by the Landlord and Tenant Act. Disputes between landlords and tenants could only be formally addressed through the court system.

In 1998, the Conservative government of Mike Harris enacted the Tenant Protection Act, which created a new regime governing residential tenancies. The act established the Ontario Rental Housing Tribunal as a quasi-judicial body to adjudicate disputes, thus largely removing landlord-tenant law from the court system.

The act and the tribunal were criticized by some people as being biased in favour of landlords. In 2006, the Liberal government of Dalton McGuinty repealed the act and replaced it with the current Residential Tenancies Act, which dissolved the Rental Housing Tribunal and established the Landlord and Tenant Board to replace it.

In 2022, the Landlord and Tennant Board of Ontario has been sued in the Superior Court of Ontario through a class action lawsuit, claiming that the LTB has caused "extreme financial hardship and loss, and emotional and psychological stress, due to the tenant being permitted and incentivized by the defendant (government of Ontario) to live rent free in Elsie’s home".

Process
Either landlords or tenants may file an application to the board. The parties can choose to first attempt to resolve the matter through mediation. If the mediation is unsuccessful or if the parties choose not to attempt mediation, then an adjudication hearing is held in which a board member hears evidence from both parties before issuing an order. The Statutory Powers Procedure Act provides a general framework for the conduct of hearings before Ontario's administrative tribunals including the LTB.

A landlord may apply to the board to increase a unit's rent above the province's rent control guidelines or to evict a tenant. Tenants can dispute evictions, apply for rent reductions or rebates due to a landlord's failure to meet maintenance obligations, apply for work orders or other orders, or grieve other violations of the Residential Tenancies Act. In Ontario a landlord cannot evict a tenant without a hearing before the board.

The Board generally hears landlord applications for non-payment of rent within 25 days of filing the application, and a decision is usually issued within four days of the hearing. All other applications (excluding L5 - Application for an Above Guideline Increase and A4s - Application to Vary the Amount of a Rent Reduction) will be scheduled for a hearing within 30 business days, and decisions will be issued within 10 business days of the conclusion of the final hearing.

As of the summer of 2022, applications and hearings are taking many months to be processed and heard.  The newspapers in Ontario have published stories about landlords being months in arrears for rent with no options available to reduce their losses while they wait for hearings. Due to the continued inaction by the LTB and delays in processing simple evictions, this has often resulted in Landlords nearing bankruptcy, becoming homeless and living on the streets.

Legal representation
In Ontario a person may be represented by an individual licensed by the Law Society of Ontario such as a lawyer or a paralegal. There are other exemptions for unpaid representatives such as direct employees of the landlord or in the case of a tenant a friend or family member. It is the obligation of the individual claiming the representation exemption to provide proof to the board of their legal authorization to represent a person or company in front of the board. Prior to a board hearing tenants are offered the opportunity to speak to tenant duty counsel that is usually provided by a community legal aid clinic funded through Legal Aid Ontario. Landlord are not allowed to access duty counsel on the hearing day.

Jurisdiction 
According to the Residential Tenancies Act, 2006 S.O the board has the jurisdiction to resolve all matters between a landlord and tenant. There are a few important differences between applications made by landlords and applications made by tenants when it relates to matters of jurisdiction. Under the Act a tenant must be in possession of a rental unit prior filling an application with the board. If a landlord files an application with the board when a tenant is not in possession of the rental unit the application will be dismissed. If a landlord would like to make a claim against a tenant after a tenant has vacated the rental unit the landlord must seek compensation through the Ontario Small Claims Court.

Changes at the Board
In September 2016 changes were made to the Residential Tenancies Act, 2006 S.O to allow victims of domestic violence to terminate their leases with only 28 days notice.

Legal decisions
Most decisions by the Ontario Landlord and Tenant Board ("LTB") are not published. CanLII does publish a sample of decisions, as of 2021-06-17 there were 19,621 decisions posted to CanLII. Other website such as Caselaw.Ninja use decisions posted to CanLII to provide more targeted research help to those who are performing legal research.

The LTB processes around 80,000 applications per year. A majority of those applications are non-payment of rent applications.

Publication of LTB decisions
Access to Adjudicative Records at the Landlord and Tenant Board is governed by the Tribunal Adjudicative Records Act, 2019, S.O. 2019, c. 7, Sched. 60, and the Freedom of Information and Protection of Privacy Act, R.S.O. 1990, c. F.31.

According to Toronto Star v. AG Ontario, 2018 ONSC 2586 (CanLII) decisions of the Ontario landlord and Tenant Board are not subject to the privacy considerations as personal information under the Freedom of Information and Protection of Privacy Act, R.S.O. 1990, c. F.31. Specifically, Toronto Star v. AG Ontario, 2018 ONSC 2586 (CanLII) states:

[61] The CLA case, in other words, did not deal with Adjudicative Records such as those in issue here; and since the documents were investigative and were not part of a record before an adjudicative tribunal, the open court principle did not apply. The same is true of the other cases referred to by counsel for the Attorney General in this regard. One of those cases entails a request by a university employee for a psychological report contained in his personnel records held by the university;[69] another entails a request by a reporter for an Auditor General forensic report "directed at the detection of fraud, waste and wrongdoing involving city resources;"[70] while a third entails a request for hospital records pertaining to the provision of abortion services.[71] None of them entails a request for Adjudicative Records.

[62] As already indicated, FIPPA does not distinguish between Adjudicative Records and non-adjudicative records. But the open court principle in s. 2(b) of the Charter only applies to Adjudicative Records. This very point lies at the core of the Supreme Court's reasoning in CLA: "Access to documents in government hands is constitutionally protected only where it is ... compatible with the function of the institution concerned."[72] Government agencies and public administrative bodies that hold investigative reports, personnel records, business and accounting records, and the like other than in an Adjudicative Record, are not subject to the open court principle.[73] They are obliged under CLA to implement transparency only where disclosure of their records is necessary for democratic process.

[63] Adjudicative Records, on the other hand, like court records, are not only entirely compatible with transparency but require it for the sake of the integrity of the administration of justice.[74] The rationale for maintaining confidentiality over records accumulated by law enforcement and forensic examiners at the investigation stage of a complaint or dispute does not, absent some special circumstance, continue into the open hearing or post-hearing stage of proceedings.[75] Thus, while access to government business records, including the content of personnel and investigative audits, is granted or withheld subject to the CLA test of "meaningful public discussion", the question of access to documents filed in the Adjudicative Record before administrative tribunals must be answered in accordance with the Charter,[76] including s. 2(b) and the open court principle.

...

[72] When it comes to fundamental Charter guarantees such as the openness principle, freedom of the press, and freedom of expression, "any encroachment upon the guarantees demand[s] justification by the state on a stringent basis."[89] Having found that FIPPA violates s. 2(b) of the Charter in two respects – substantively by imposing a reverse onus on a request for Adjudicative Records, and procedurally by occasioning delay in accessing Adjudicative Records – it is necessary to turn to s. 1 of the Charter. It is here that the analysis of Charter rights takes on "a more contextual approach and indicate[s] the harms that might be caused to other rights and interests".[90] These include, most notably, the privacy rights of litigants and the administration of justice in administrative tribunals.

[73] In considering whether FIPPA's limits on freedom of expression are reasonable and justifiable in a free and democratic society, the analysis follows the Oakes test.[91]  It will therefore consider whether the legislative objective is pressing and substantial, whether the means chosen by the legislature is rationally connected to the objective, whether the legislation minimally impairs the right of free expression, and whether it is proportional considering the deleterious and salutary effects on the right.

...

[107] The Charter requires public access to Adjudicative Records, which may be tempered on a case-by-case basis by other considerations – integrity of the administration of justice, safety and security of informants and other third parties, privacy for complainants and other litigants, etc. For an unconstitutional law, "the usual remedy lies under s. 52(1), which provides that the law is of no force or effect to the extent that it is inconsistent with the Charter.... Section 24(1), by contrast, is generally used as a remedy, not for unconstitutional laws, but for unconstitutional government acts."[128]

...

[143] There shall be a declaration that the application of ss. 21(1) to (3) and related sections of FIPPA pertaining to the presumption of non-disclosure of "personal information" to Adjudicative Records held by the remaining institutions named in the Notice of Application infringes s. 2(b) of the Charter and is not justified under s. 1. It is therefore of no force or effect.

[144] The declaration of invalidity of this aspect of FIPPA is suspended for 12 months from the date of this judgment.

References

External links

2007 establishments in Ontario
Courts and tribunals established in 2007
Ontario government tribunals
Landlord–tenant law
Ontario law
Real property law of Canada